Tony Wright  (born 23 October 1949, in London), also known as Sue Ab Surd, is an artist who created album covers such as Bob Marley's Natty Dread and Traffic's The Low Spark of High Heeled Boys and others including Bob Dylan's Saved. His art work for Traffic's 1971 album The Low Spark of High Heeled Boys and Steve Winwood's 1980 Arc of a Diver were listed amongst Rolling Stone's 100 Greatest Album Covers. The cover for The Low Spark of High Heeled Boys is part of the permanent collection of the Museum of Modern Art.

Album art
1971 Traffic, The Low Spark of High Heeled Boys
1973 Traffic, Shoot Out at the Fantasy Factory
1973 The Meters, Cissy Strut
1973 Sharks, First Water
1973 Chris Stainton, Tundra
1974 Bob Marley, Natty Dread
1974 Jim Capaldi, Whale Meat Again
1975 Peter Skellern, Hard Times
1975 Fania All Stars, Salsa
1975 Kevin Ayers, Sweet Deceiver
1976 David Essex, Out on the Street
1976 Max Romeo, War Ina Babylon
1976 Third World, Third World
1976 Lee Perry, Super Ape
1976 Aswad
1976 Boxer, Bloodletting
1977 Martin Briley, Before and Beyond
1977 John Martyn, One World
1977 Third World, 96° In The Shade
1977 David Essex, Gold and Ivory
1977 Junior Murvin, Police and Thieves
1977 Jorge Ben, Tropical
1977 Go, Live from Paris
1978 Ijahman, Haile I Hymn
1978 Rico Rodriguez, Man from Wareika
1979 David Essex, Imperial Wizard
1979 Third World, Journey to Addis
1979 Ijahman, Are We a Warrior
1979 The B-52's, The B-52's
1980 Bob Dylan, Saved
1980 Black Uhuru, Sinsemilla
1980 Davitt Sigerson
1980 Steve Winwood, Arc of a Diver
1980 Marianne Faithfull, Broken English
1980 Cristina
1980 Suicide
1981 Kid Creole and the Coconuts, Fresh Fruit in Foreign Places
1982 Chic, Take It Off
1982 Steve Winwood, Talking Back to the Night
1983 Ramones, Subterranean Jungle
1983 Marianne Faithfull, A Child’s Adventure
1984 Sly and Robbie, Language Barrier
1984 Ramones, Too Tough to Die
1985 Various Artists, Sun City
1986 Trouble Funk, Trouble Over Here Trouble Over There
1986 Tama Janowitz, Cannibal in Manhattan (novel)
1987 Sly and Robbie, Rhythm Killers
1987 Gary Windo, Deep Water
1987 Marianne Faithfull, Strange Weather
1988 Melissa Etheridge, Melissa Etheridge
1988 Allen Ginsberg
1989 The Buck Pets
1990 William S. Burroughs
1995 Jude Cole, I Don't Know Why I Act This Way
2001 Local H, Here Comes the Zoo
2001 Skindive
2001 Gigi
2002 Supreme Beings of Leisure, Divine Operating System

Book illustration
Angel: The Diary of a Mystic. 1976.
Fantastic Woman: A Song of Songs. 1980
Assisi, Francis of. Hymn of the Sun. 1990
City. 1995
Dance of Death: Forty Paintings, Forty Quotations. 2006

Awards
Benjamin Franklin Award. 1991. First Prize. Religion/Metaphysics/Spirituality.
Catholic Press Association 1991 Book Award. First prize.
Print Magazine. Design Award. 1996
American Graphic Design Award 1997
Drench Design Award.2005
Design Greenproject Award. 2006

Notes

External links

1949 births
Living people
Artists from London